The following is an incomplete list of islands of Iraq.

 Aloos Island, Euphrates (Al Anbar Governorate)
 Hajjam Island
 Jubbah Island, Euphrates (Al Anbar Governorate)
 Om al-Babi Island, Shatt al-Arab
 Om al-Khanazeer Island (Mother of Pigs Island), Baghdad
 Majnoon Island
 Sindbad Island, Shatt al-Arab
 Om Al-Rasas Island (Mother of Lead Island), Shatt al-Arab
 Qanus Island, Tigris (Salah ad Din province)

See also
 Geography of Iraq

Iraq
 
Islands